Natashquan Airport  is located adjacent to Natashquan, Quebec, Canada.

Airlines and destinations

References

External links

Certified airports in Côte-Nord